Pierre Duclos is a French curler.

At the national level, he is (as a skip) a one-time French men's champion curler (1974).

Teams

References

External links
 

Living people
French male curlers
French curling champions
Year of birth missing (living people)
Place of birth missing (living people)